Sutești is a commune located in Vâlcea County, Oltenia, Romania. It is composed of four villages: Sutești, Boroșești, Mazili and Verdea. The commune also included Mitrofani, Cetățeaua, Izvorașu and Racu villages until 2004, when they were split off to form Mitrofani Commune.

References

Communes in Vâlcea County
Localities in Oltenia